Events from the year 1458 in France

Incumbents
 Monarch – Charles VII

Death
 22 March – Antoine, Count of Vaudémont, nobleman (born 1400)
 26 December – Arthur III, Duke of Brittany, ruler of Brittany (born 1393)

References

1450s in France